The Mendez Women (Spanish:Las de Méndez) is a 1927 Spanish silent drama film directed by Fernando Delgado and starring Carmen Viance. It is now considered a lost film.

Cast

References

Bibliography
 Bentley, Bernard. A Companion to Spanish Cinema. Boydell & Brewer 2008.

External links 

1927 films
1927 drama films
Spanish silent films
Spanish drama films
1920s Spanish-language films
Films directed by Fernando Delgado
Spanish black-and-white films
Lost drama films
Lost Spanish films
Silent drama films